Ferrato is an Italian surname. Notable people with the surname include:

Donna Ferrato (born 1949), American photojournalist and activist
Mattia Ferrato (born 1989), Italian footballer

Italian-language surnames